Storøyjøkulen is an ice cap covering the southern part of the island Storøya in the Svalbard archipelago, east of Nordaustlandet. The glacier reaches a height of about 250 m.a.s.l. The southern thip of glacier forms the headland Sørodden.

References

Glaciers of Svalbard
Storøya